Joanne Aniku Okia is a Ugandan politician in the National Resistance Movement Party. She is the first woman member of parliament for Madi Okollo District and won the parliamentary seat unopposed in the national general election of 2021.

Okia contributed to the resolution of a long-standing border conflict between Madi Okollo District and Terrego District.

Reference 

Year of birth missing (living people)
Living people